Chepachet is a village and census-designated place (CDP) in the town of Glocester in the northwestern part of the U.S. state of Rhode Island.  It is centered at the intersection of U.S. Route 44 ( Putnam Pike) and Rhode Island Route 102 (also known as Victory Highway and Chopmist Hill Road). Chepachet's ZIP code is 02814. As of the 2010 census, the CDP had a population of 1,675.

History
"Chepachet" was originally inhabited by the Pequot and Nipmuc natives; the name means "where rivers meet". 

Leading up to the American Revolution, the area was a hotbed for supporters of independence, and the Gloucester Light Infantry was founded in the Chepachet in 1774. During the Revolutionary War Loyalists from Newport were exiled near Chepachet, including Thomas Vernon, who recorded election celebrations in Chepachet in 1776:

This being the day for the choice of Deputies (members of the General Assembly). We are told that there is a very great resort of people of all kinds at Chepasseh, and that it is a day of great frolicking. Our landlord and his three sons are gone, having rigged themselves out in the best manner.  [A] man on horseback passed by (together with many others) with a very large bag full of cakes made by Granne West (mother to the General William West) which are to be sold to the people.

In 1842, Chepachet was the setting of the endgame of the Dorr Rebellion, which helped to win voting rights for non-landowners in a new state Constitution.

On 4 November 1923, horror writer H. P. Lovecraft and his fellow writer C. M. Eddy, Jr. ventured to Chepachet in search of a place known as "Dark Swamp" of which they had heard rumors. They never located it, but the region inspired at least the opening of Lovecraft's story (novelette) "The Colour Out of Space", and the setting contributed to Eddy's unfinished story "Black Noon". Chepachet is also mentioned several times in Lovecraft's story (novelette) "The Horror at Red Hook".
 
Since 1926, the town has hosted the Ancients and Horribles parade, an annual Fourth of July event, notable for its political statements and ribald humor.

In the 1940s, a US Navy auxiliary ship, the fleet fuel oil tanker, USS Chepachet, was named after the Chepachet River which runs through the village. The ship's bell is displayed at the seat of town government, and the ship's surviving crew had a 50th anniversary reunion in the town in 1998.

Beginning with a proclamation in 1976, May 25 is recognized as "Elephant Day".  On that date in 1826, a popular elephant known as Betty the Learned Elephant from a traveling show was shot and killed while she was crossing the bridge spanning the Chepachet River.  A group of six "hooligans" led by Canton Smith of nearby North Scituate faced charges for the crime.  A commemorative plaque marks the historic location on the bridge.

Schools
The area, part of the town of Glocester, is part of the Foster-Glocester Regional School District, meaning Ponaganset High School is the only secondary school for residents of Chepachet. West Glocester Elementary, an elementary school in Chepachet, is part of the Glocester Elementary School District. The regional district is currently reviewing the Ponaganset High School & Middle School mascot, the Chieftain, as the local Native American tribe, the Nipmuc, have been asking for decades that it be changed.

Shops
The village has many local shops and businesses including:
Brown & Hopkins General Store
Dino's Park & Shop
Tavern on Main
Trish Hampton Dog Boutique
Village Bean Cafe
White Rock Motel

Notable people

 Asa Aldis, Chief Justice of the Vermont Supreme Court
 Phil Paine, Major League Baseball player

Images

See also

National Register of Historic Places listings in Providence County, Rhode Island
Ancient and Horribles Parade
Dorr Rebellion
Ponaganset High School

References

External links
 Death of Betty the Elephant

Historic districts in Providence County, Rhode Island
Villages in Providence County, Rhode Island
Glocester, Rhode Island
Census-designated places in Providence County, Rhode Island
Providence metropolitan area
Villages in Rhode Island
Census-designated places in Rhode Island
Historic districts on the National Register of Historic Places in Rhode Island
National Register of Historic Places in Providence County, Rhode Island